Paul Parker may refer to: 

 Paul B. Parker (1898–?), American football and basketball coach
 Paul Parker (cricketer) (born 1956), English schoolmaster and former cricketer 
 Paul Parker (footballer) (born 1964), retired English footballer
 Paul Parker (singer) (living), American disco singer